Baghdoba is a village in Kamrup rural district, in the state of Assam, India, situated on the north bank of river Brahmaputra.

Transport
The village is connected through National Highway 27 to nearby towns and cities.

See also
 Bagmarachar
 Badlabazar

References

Villages in Kamrup district